The 2011 Spengler Cup was held in Davos, Switzerland from 26 to 3 December 2011. All matches were played at host HC Davos's home Vaillant Arena. The number of teams was expanded in 2010 from 5 to 6 in comparison to previous seasons, and split into two groups of three. The two groups, named Torriani and Cattini, were named after legendary Swiss hockey players Bibi Torriani and Hans Cattini. HC Davos won the event for a record 15th time.

Teams participating
The list of teams that have been confirmed for the tournament are as listed:

 HC Davos (host)
 Team Canada
 Dinamo Riga
 EHC Wolfsburg Grizzly Adams
 HC Vítkovice Steel
 Kloten Flyers

The division of the teams into the two groups and the subsequent schedule were determined on 2 September 2011.

Match Officials
Here is the list of match officials that have been confirmed for the tournament:

Group stage

Key
W (regulation win) – 3 pts.
OTW (overtime/shootout win) – 2 pts.
OTL (overtime/shootout loss) – 1 pt.
L (regulation loss) – 0 pts.

Group Torriani

All times are local (UTC+1).

Group Cattini

All times are local (UTC+1).

Knockout stage

Key: * – final in overtime. ** – final in shootout.

Quarterfinals

All times are local (UTC+1).

Semifinals

All times are local (UTC+1).

Final

All times are local (UTC+1).

Champions

All-Star Team

Statistics

Scoring leaders

Television
Several television channels around the world will cover many or all matches of the Spengler Cup. As well as most Swiss channels, here is a listing of who else will cover the tournament:

Schweizer Fernsehen (Switzerland, host broadcaster)
The Sports Network (Canada)
LTV7 (Latvia)
Eurosport 2, British Eurosport, Eurosport Asia and Pacific, and Eurosport HD
Nova Sport (Czech Republic, Slovakia)

References

External links

2011-12
2011–12 in Swiss ice hockey
2011–12 in German ice hockey
2011–12 in Canadian ice hockey
2011–12 in Czech ice hockey
December 2011 sports events in Europe